O thisavros tou makariti or Dead Man's Treasure is a 1959 Greek comedy film produced by Finos Film. Based on a play written by Nikos Tsiforos and Polivios Vasileiadis, it was one of the last films Tsiforos directed for Finos and was regarded as some of their best work. Georgia Vasileiadou, Vasilis Avlonitis, Nikos Rizos, and Stefanos Linaios featured in the film. The story drew on the development of polykatoikla (roughly translated as many modern dwellings) apartments that occurred in Athens in the post-World War II era as a setting to explore women using their poniria (craftiness or guile) as a means to get things done.

The film was one of Filos Film's most successful in its first 15 years with the talents of the comic duo of Avlonitis-Vasileiadou and Nikos Rizos.  Building on their success, the pair formed the "Avlonitis-Vassiliadou-Rizos" company two years later, which received awards in the first half of the 1960s.  The film also included Xenia Kalogeropoulou, recently arrived from studies in England, singer Antzela Zilia, and actress and a young celebrity Stefanos Linaios. Georgia Vasileiadou sang the song O kir Mendios (Ο κυρ Μέντιος) and it is the first time she sings on screen, despite the fact that she began her career as an opera singer.

Plot
A cunning widow and her niece live in a very old house which they inherited from her husband. By spreading rumours of a treasure chest with a huge fortune hidden in the house, the women are able to rent out several rooms to treasure-hunters. A builder attempts to manipulate the woman into selling the "worthless" house, while she manipulates the builder and the new tenants into damaging the house so she can force modern refurbishments for the house.  The tenants and builder become involved in a tangled web of love, lies, and emotional entanglements building to the happy ending.

Cast
Georgia Vasileiadou as Theoni Kanelopiperidou
Vasilis Avlonitis as Neokosmos
Nikos Rizos as Stelios Prousoglou
Xenia Kalogeropoulou as Loukia Kanelopiperidou
Stefanos Linaios as Iraklis
Antzela Zilia as Dolly Roza
Takis Christoforidis
Giorgos Lefteriotis as Vasos
Nikos Fermas as Thanasis
Giannis Vogiatzis as lawyer

References

External links

1959 films
1950s Greek-language films
1959 comedy films
Finos Film films
Greek comedy films